is an early magical girl manga series written and illustrated by Fujio Akatsuka. It was published in Shueisha's monthly Ribon magazine from 1962 to 1965. While Akko-chan predates the Sally the Witch manga, the Sally anime adaptation predates Akko-chans.

The first Himitsu no Akko-chan anime adaptation ran for 94 episodes from 1969 to 1970. It was animated by Toei Animation and broadcast by TV Asahi (then known as NET). It has been remade twice, in 1988 (61 episodes, featuring Mitsuko Horie in the role of Akko-chan and singing the opening and ending themes) and in 1998 (44 episodes).

Two movies were produced. Himitsu no Akko-chan Movie and Umi da! Obake da!! Natsu Matsuri both released in 1989. It was adapted into a live-action film released on September 1, 2012.

Currently, an adaptation of the series is running as a web manga, ひみつのアッコちゃん μ (Himitsu no Akko-Chan μ, pronounced "myu".) It is written by Hiroshi Izawa, and drawn by Futago Kamikita.

Plot
Atsuko Kagami is a childlike, arrogant elementary school girl who has an affinity for mirrors. One day, her favorite mirror which was given to Akko by her mother (or in some versions, by her father, as a present from India) is broken, and she prefers to bury it in her yard rather than throw it in the trash can.

In her dreams, she is contacted by a spirit (or in some cases the Queen of the Mirror Kingdom) who is touched that the girl would treat the mirror so respectfully and not simply throw it away. Akko-chan is then given the gift of a magical mirror and taught enchantments, "tekumaku mayakon, tekumaku mayakon" and "lamipus lamipus lu lu lu lu lu". that will allow her to transform into anything she wishes.

Characters

Voiced by Yoshiko Ōta (1969), Mitsuko Horie (1988), Wakana Yamazaki (1998), Aya Hirano (2012)Haruka Ayase (movie)
The titular protagonist. Atsuko Kagami is often called Akko-chan for short. 鏡アツ子, from the name 加賀美あつ子 but with the family-name part 加賀美, "Kagami" ("mirror"), replaced by 鏡. She is known as "Stilly," "Caroline," or "Julie" in Western versions of the anime.

Voiced by Reiko Senō (1969), Yoshiko Ōta (1988), Miina Tominaga (1998)
Akko's mother. 

Voiced by Ichirō Murakoshi (1969), Banjō Ginga (1988), Ken Yamaguchi (1998) 
Akko's father.

Voiced by Sumiko Shirakawa (1969), Kazuko Sugiyama (1988), Kikumi Umeda (1998)
Akko's best friend. 

Voiced by Akiko Tsuboi (1969), Noriko Uemura (1988), Harumi Ikoma (1998) 
Moko's younger brother. 

Voiced by Junko Hori, Mariko Takigawa (1969), Noriko Tsukase, Yuko Mita (1988), Junko Takeuchi (1998)
Kankichi's friend. 

Voiced by Hiroko Maruyama (1969), Keiko Yamamoto (1988 and 1998)
A young girl who likes to spy on Akko. 

Voiced by Hiroshi Ōtake (1969), Yoku Shioya (1988), Takuma Suzuki (1998)
A hefty boy and rival to Akko. He has a secret crush on her.

Voiced by Sachiko Chijimatsu (1969), Michiko Hirai (1969, episodes 56 and 61), Katsue Miwa (1988), Satomi Korogi (1998)
Taisho's younger brother. 

Voiced by Junko Hori (1969), Michitaka Kobayashi (1988), Yoshihiko Akida (1998)
Henchman of Taisho. 

Voiced by Kōko Kagawa, Junko Hori, Mariko Takigawa (1969), Noriko Tsukase, Chie Sato (1988), Yasuhiro Takato (1998)
Henchman of Taisho. 

Voiced by Sachiko Chijimatsu, Kōko Kagawa (1969), Naoko Watanabe (1988), Ai Nagano (1998)
Akko's cat.

Voiced by Ichiro Murakoshi, Hiroshi Otake (1969), Masaharu Sato (1988), Yasuhiro Takato (1998)
Taisho's cat.

Voiced by Osamu Ichikawa (1969), Masaharu Sato (1988), Hiroki Takahashi (1998)
Homeroom teacher of Akko and Moko.

Voiced by Naoko Takahashi, Kōko Kagawa (1969), Kyoko Irokawa (1988), Ai Nagano (1998)
English teacher.

Voiced by Reiko Senoo, Kōko Kagawa (1969), Eiko Masuyama (1988), Mitsuko Horie (1998)
A queen from the distant "Magic Country". She provides Akko with her compact mirror.

Exclusive to 1969 Anime
Narrator
Voiced by Shun Yashiro

Voiced by Shun Yashiro
A talking parrot.

Exclusive to 1988 Anime

Voiced by Shigeru Nakahara
Prince of Mirror Country

Voiced by Kazumi Tanaka
Elderly servant of Kio 

Voiced by Kazumi Tanaka
A strange man who shows up randomly.

Exclusive to 1998 Anime

Voiced by Junko Takeuchi
A penguin who joins Akko and friends.

Exclusive to 2012 Movie

Voiced by Masaki Okada

Foreign distribution
The only media in the franchise to be officially translated into English is the 1980s run of the manga, translated as Akko-Chan's Got a Secret! The series briefly aired in its original Japanese on California channel KWHY-TV in the mid 1970s as Akko Chan's Secret.

Otherwise largely unknown in the English-speaking world, Himitsu no Akko-chan enjoyed a good deal of success when it was exported to the European market in the 1980s. All three Akko-chan series have been screened on TV in Italy.
 Lo specchio magico (Italian, first series) Caroline (French, second series; pronounced "Cah-ro-LEHN")
 Los secretos de Julie (Spanish language version shown in Latin America, first series)
 El Secreto de Akko (Spanish version shown in Spain, third series)
 Un mondo di magia (Italian, second series)
 Stilly e lo specchio magico (Italian, third series): In series three, as in series one, "Stilly" is the Italian name for Akko-chan.
 Czarodziejskie zwierciadełko'' (Polish, first series)

References

External links
Toei Animation's Himitsu no Akko-chan page (Japanese)

 
  (Japanese)
 The first anime series
 The 2012 film

1962 manga
1965 comics endings
1969 anime television series debuts
1970 Japanese television series endings
1988 anime television series debuts
1989 Japanese television series endings
1998 anime television series debuts
1999 Japanese television series endings
Comedy anime and manga
Fuji TV original programming
Fujio Akatsuka
Japanese children's television series
Live-action films based on manga
Magical girl anime and manga
Manga adapted into films
Romance anime and manga
Fiction about shapeshifting
Shōjo manga
Toei Animation films
Toei Animation television
TV Asahi original programming
Japanese comedy films
Japanese romance films